Forest City (2001 pop.: 12) is a rural community in York County, New Brunswick, Canada.

The community has the unusual distinction of sharing its name with the community of Forest City immediately across the Canada–United States border in the state of Maine.

Forest City was once home to 1,000 residents, where its proximity to the waters of East Grand Lake and the softwood forests of the upper St. Croix River watershed provided a lucrative tanning industry that supported an active economy. Remnants of industry can still be found today.

The community houses a church, cemetery, and a small water control dam.

History

Notable people

See also
List of communities in New Brunswick

References

Communities in York County, New Brunswick
Divided cities